David Archuleta is the debut album by American singer David Archuleta. It was released first released in the US on November 11, 2008, by Jive Records. The album was certified gold by the RIAA (denoting shipments of 500,000 copies) on January 29, 2009. The first single, "Crush", was released to radio on August 1. The album was released in the UK on May 11, 2009. The UK album release was set to coincide with his UK tour with Rock/Pop band McFly in April/May 2009.

Singles 
The first single, "Crush", was released to radio on August 1, 2008, and was commercially released on August 12, 2008. Its first week it debuted at number two on the Billboard Hot 100 with 166,000 units sold. The single has sold almost 2 million copies in the United States.

Archuleta confirmed on his official MySpace blog on November 21, 2008, that "A Little Too Not Over You", a song which he co-wrote, was the next single following "Crush". It was released to radio on January 6, 2009.

On March 13, 2009, Archuleta released a couple of songs from David Archuleta on iTunes that were previously not available as single downloads. "Works for Me" came as a bonus track on the Walmart version of David Archuleta, and "Somebody Out There" was exclusive to those who pre-ordered the album on iTunes. Both songs were also included in a four-track EP titled Four for the Fans, released in 2010 exclusively on iTunes, before the release of Archuleta's single, "Something 'Bout Love", from his third studio album, The Other Side of Down (2010).

Critical reception 

David Archuleta received mixed reviews from critics. Billboard praised David Archuleta, calling it "charming" and filled with performances "meant for arenas". It also credited Archuleta as having a "once-in-a-decade pop voice: A silky tenor with a natural melancholy." Ken Barnes of USA Today gave the album a positive review saying, "On American Idol runner-up David Archuleta's first, self-titled album, the 17-year-old singer delivers a non-stop succession of polite pop songs swathed in gauzy cotton-candy textures and catchy choruses. And that's exactly what he should be doing." The New York Times writes "(Archuleta) has a lovely, foggy R&B voice out of scale with his small body". Writes the review, "The music, made by many producers and songwriters, averages out different forms of radio-format blandness, with tinges of Coldplay and Shania Twain, and a few dollops of good writing." Los Angeles Times wrote The record is larded with awkward modernist R&B, Christian semaphore ballads like 'You Can' and warm-milk mewling that makes David Cook, Archuleta's "Idol" foe, sound like Robert Plant.

Commercial performance 
The album debuted at number two on the US Billboard 200 chart (issue of November 29, 2008), with sales of 183,000 copies in the United States. As of January 2011, the album has sold 764,000 copies in the United States.

Track listing

Personnel 
Adapted from AllMusic.

 David Archuleta – piano, lead vocals, background vocals
 Antonina Armato –   producer
 Jeff Baker – audio engineer
 Jeff Baker – assistant engineer
 Brett Banducci – viola
 Zukhan Bey – drum programming
 Jeff Bova – arranger, string arrangements, strings
 Cara Bridgins – production coordination
 Andreas Carlsson –   producer
 JC Chasez –   piano, producer, background vocals
 Desmond Child –   producer
 Adam Comstock – audio engineer, engineer
 Randy Cooke – drums
 Tom Coyne – mastering
 Dorian Crozier – drums, engineer
 Tim Davies – conductor
 Tommy Denander – engineer, guitar, guitars
 Thomas Diener – viola
 Kara DioGuardi – background vocals
 Marcus Englöf – keyboards, programming
 Stephen Erdody – celli, cello
 James Fauntleroy – background vocals
 Jeff Fenster – a&r
 Marlow Fisher – viola
 Chris Fudurich – engineer
 Storm L. Gardner – background vocals
 Brian Gately – production coordination
 Humberto Gatica – vocal engineer
 Matthew Gerrard – audio engineer,   engineer, keyboards, producer, programming
 Julie Gigante – violin
 Conor Gilligan – assistant
 Matty Green – assistant
 Steve Hammons – audio engineer, engineer
 Trevor Handy – cello
 Jimmy Harry –   bass, bass instrument, engineer, guitars, keyboards, producer
 Paula Hochhalter – cello
 David Hodges –   keyboards, piano, producer, programming, background vocals
 Ross Hogarth – audio engineer, engineer
 Sean Hurley – bass, bass instrument
 Devrim "DK" Karaoglu –   producer
 Steve Kipner –   producer
 Emanuel Kiriakou –   bass, bass instrument, drum programming, engineer, guitar (acoustic), guitar (electric), keyboards, piano, producer, background vocals
 Mike Krompass – audio engineer,   engineer, guitar (acoustic), guitar (electric), producer
 Natalie Leggett – violin
 Dimitrie Leivici – violin
 Thomas Lindberg – bass, bass instrument
 Nigel Lundemo – audio engineer, engineer
 Brian Macleod – drums
 Erik Madrid – assistant
 Manny Marroquin – mixing
 Maria P. Marulanda – art direction, design
 Luke Maurer – viola
 Steve McEwan –   producer
 Justin Meldal-johnsen – Bass Instrument
 Corey Miller – assistant engineer, audio engineer
 Robbie Nevil –   keyboards, producer, programming
 Paul Palmer – mixing
 Alex Papaconstantinou – keyboards, programming
 Searmi Park – violin
 Cameron Patrick – violin
 Brian Paturalski – mixing
 Tim Pierce – guitar, guitars
 Christian Plata – assistant
 Shari Reich – artist coordination
 Chris Reynolds – audio engineer, digital editing, engineer
 Jeff Riedel – photography
 Cristián Robles – vocal engineer
 Andros Rodriguez – engineer
 Francesco Romano – guitar (acoustic)
 Eric Ivan Rosse – arranger, keyboards, mixing
 Peter Rotter – contractor
 Ken Sarkey – assistant
 Nicole Simon – production coordination
 Jake Simpson – background vocals
 Jeanne Skrocki – violin
 Spike Stent – mixing
 Aaron Sterling – drums
 Cameron Stone – celli, cello
 Shane Swayney – guitar, guitars, keyboards, programming
 Sarah Thornblade – violin
 Pat Thrall – digital editing, engineer, mixing
 Dapo Torimiro –   keyboards, producer
 Cecilia Tsan – cello
 Marc VanGool – guitar, guitars
 Jon Vella – engineer, guitar, guitars
 Bruce Watson – guitar, guitars
 Bruce Waynne –   producer
 Wayne Wilkins –   drums, keyboards, producer
 Margaret Wooten – violin

Charts

Weekly charts

Year-end charts

Certifications and sales

Release history

References 

2008 debut albums
David Archuleta albums
Jive Records albums
Albums produced by Midi Mafia
Albums produced by Desmond Child
Albums produced by Emanuel Kiriakou
19 Recordings albums